Sweet, founded by Shannon Wentworth and Jen Rainen in April 2008, is a travel company, which sells eco-friendly vacation packages and tours to the lesbian community.  Sweet's mission is to offer vacations that empower and motivate guests to achieve their personal, professional, and philanthropic goals. Sweet travelers or "Sweeties," have raised over $500,000 in cash and in-kind donations, planted 6,217 trees, removed 407 bags of trash from beaches, and revitalized five schools and parks.  In furtherance of Sweet's efforts to help the environment, the company teamed up with CarbonFund.org to help reforest a large area along the Tensas River in Louisiana.

Entertainers who have performed at Sweet events include comediennes Suzanne Westenhoefer, Fortune Feimster, Bridget McManus, Jennie McNulty, Sandra Valls, Gloria Bigelow, as well as singers Jen Foster, Edie Carey, and more.

References

See also
Interview: Sweet's Shannon Wentworth on Building Community and Changing the Landscape of Lesbian Travel
Sweet! Lesbians Offset Carbon Footprint of New Cruise
Cherrybomb: Sexpectations and Vacations
Shannon on The Lesbian Podcast
We like it Sweet
Back to 100 Women We Love: Class of 2009(in no particular order, cause we love em' all!)
A bounty of theme cruises this fall
Theme cruise ships have bikers, nudity and a whole lot more
Gay, lesbian cruise travel popularity growing
Sweet Official Website

LGBT tourism
Travel and holiday companies of the United States
American companies established in 2008
Transport companies established in 2008
Companies based in San Francisco
2008 establishments in California